Caesionidae, the  fusiliers, are a family of marine ray-finned fishes in the order Perciformes. The family includes about 23 species. They are related to the snappers, but adapted for feeding on plankton, rather than on larger prey. They are found at reefs in the Indo-Pacific and in the Red Sea.

Taxonomy 
Caesionidae was named by the French zoologist Charles Lucien Bonaparte in 1831. The family takes its name from the genus Caesio which was named in 1801 by Bernard Germain de Lacépède, the name derived from caesius meaning “blue”, as the type species of Caesio is the blue and gold fusilier (Caesio caerulaurea). They are sometimes divided into two subfamilies, the Caesioninae containing the genera Caesio and Pterocaesio and the monotypic genera Dipterygonotus and Gymoceasio in the Gymnocaesoninae. Some authorities place the fusiliers within the family Lutjanidae, the snappers, even going as far as placing the within the subfamily Lutjaninae. The 5th edition of Fishes of the World, however, retains it as a separate family while acknowledging the close relationship to the snappers but states that more morphological and molecular studies are required to ascertain its true status.

Genera 
The following genera are classified within the family Caesionidae:

 Caesio Lacépède, 1801
 Dipterygonotus Bleeker, 1849
 Gymnocaesio Bleeker, 1876
 Pterocaesio Bleeker, 1876

Characteristics 
Caesionidae fusiliers have cylindrical and streamlined bodies, with an oblong or fusiform shape and which are laterally flattened. Their shape is similar to the closely related Lutjaninae snappers. A line drawn along the body from the snout to the centre of the tail would pass through the eye. They have small, protrusible mouths with small teeth in the jaws and there may or may not be teeth on the other parts of the mouth. They have a deeply forked caudal fin with angular tips to the lobes. The dorsal and anal fins are quite evenly sloped from the front to the back, except that in Dipterygonotus they are not evenly sloped and some dorsal spines are nearly separate. The dorsal fins have 10-15 thin  spines and 8-22 soft rays while the anal fin contains 3 spines and 9-13 soft rays. The pelvic fins have a single spine and 5 soft rays while the pectoral fins contain 16-24 rays. In most species the dorsal and anal fins have scales. Fusiliers do my have stripes on the flanks, some species have black markings on their tails but in all species the axil of the pectoral fins is black.

Distribution and habitat 
Caesionidae are found in the Indo-Pacific region.

Biology 
Caesionidae are schooling fish, often in mixed species aggregations with other fusiliers. The extensible upper jaws.are adapted for picking zooplankton. Fusiliers are diurnal, they spend the day feeding in large aggregations in middle of the water column over reefs, along steep outer reef slopes and around pinnacles in deep water in lagoons. They are active swimmers but often pause to feeds or to visit the stations of cleaner fish. They shelter in the reef during the night.

Fisheries 
Caesionidae fishes are highly important species for coral reef fisheries, these fisheries use drive-in nets to catch fusiliers. Typically they are sold as fresh fish but they may also be fermented to make fish paste. They are also caught by tuna fishers for use as bait.

Timeline

References

 Carpenter, K.E. (1987) "Revision of the Indo-Pacific fish family Caesionidae (Lutjanoidea), with descriptions of five new species." Indo-Pacific Fishes (15):56

 
Taxa named by Charles Lucien Bonaparte
Perciformes families